Ann David-Antoine (born July 6, 1949) is a Grenadian politician, nurse, and midwife.  She has served as the island's Minister of Health, Social Security, the Environment and Ecclesiastic Relations, and is a Justice of the Peace.  David-Antoine is a member of the New National Party, and serves as well as a justice of the peace.  She has lectured in health studies at Uxbridge College.

References
Candidate profile on party website

1949 births
Living people
Members of the Senate of Grenada
Government ministers of Grenada
New National Party (Grenada) politicians
Women government ministers of Grenada